Marion Fay "Mimi" Alford (née Beardsley; born May 7, 1943) is an American woman who allegedly had an affair with President John F. Kennedy while she served as an intern in the White House press office between 1962 and 1963. 

Despite the affair's consuming influence over her life at the time, Alford managed to keep the illicit trysts a secret for 40 years, until clues were leaked in 2003. Alford published her own book about the affair, Once Upon a Secret, in 2011.

Early life
Marion Fay Beardsley was born in New York City, and was raised in Middletown Township, New Jersey. She was educated at Miss Porter's School in Connecticut. While working as an editor in 1961 at her high school newspaper, the Salmagundy, she wrote to the White House and requested an interview with Jacqueline Kennedy, who herself had been an editor of Salmagundy at Miss Porter's School. Mrs. Kennedy was unable to fit a meeting into her schedule, but her social secretary, Letitia Baldrige, also a Miss Porter's alumna, invited Beardsley to come to the White House and interview her about Mrs. Kennedy.  She briefly met President Kennedy during this visit.

In Beardsley's first year at Wheaton College, the White House offered her an open position as a summer intern in the White House press office; she accepted and began her internship in 1962. She was asked back for the following summer and visited the White House in between.

White House intern and Kennedy affair allegation
On her fourth day in the White House press office, President Kennedy’s special assistant, Dave Powers, asked Beardsley if she would like to join a group in the residence's swimming pool, where, to her surprise, they were joined by President Kennedy. She was asked to join a cocktail party in the residence that evening, and the President offered her a personal tour of the home. After Kennedy led her into Jackie's powder blue bedroom, she and Kennedy had sex, which was Beardsley's first sexual encounter.

The resultant affair lasted 18 months, during which time Beardsley, still a Wheaton student, met Tony Fahnestock, a student at Williams, and they became engaged. The affair with the President began to cool and he sometimes humiliated her. The pressures of her double life drove her to leave college after her sophomore year. Alford said that she and the President did not have sexual relations after August 1963, though she retained her position in the White House. She was disappointed to be dropped from the trip to Dallas, Texas with Kennedy in November 1963, but Jacqueline had decided to go there with him. The last time she saw Kennedy, on November 15, 1963, he gave her $300 cash as a wedding present and asked that she buy "something fantastic" to wear, "then come back and show me." She bought a gray suit.

Later life
Several hours after Kennedy was assassinated, Beardsley broke down and confessed the affair to her fiancé Tony Fahnestock. Although he was deeply hurt and angry, they married on schedule, in January 1964. The marriage produced two daughters and ended in divorce in 1990. Fahnestock died of cancer three years after the divorce, at age 52. Beardsley returned to college and graduated in 1994. She married Richard Alford, a sports marketing executive with IMG, in 2005. Alford is a grandmother and a retired New York City church administrator.

Revelation of affair
In 2002, while historian Robert Dallek was researching his biography An Unfinished Life: John F. Kennedy, 1917–1963, he came across a 1964 interview with Kennedy press aide Barbara Gamarekian in the JFK Presidential Library that described, in a roundabout way, Kennedy's dalliances with an intern named Mimi who "couldn't type", who "had no skills", "who obviously couldn't perform any function at all" and others who worked in the press office. At Gamarekian's request in 1964, this part of her interview was permanently sealed, but Dallek persuaded her to unseal it so that he might include in his biography mention of a "tall, slender, beautiful" intern among Kennedy's White House diversions, in the context of his argument that Kennedy was undistracted from duty by health troubles or women. The unsealed section was leaked by a JFK Library archivist on April 24, 2003, six days before Dallek's publication date. Reporters hastened to identify the intern and on May 13 the New York Daily News ran a front-page teaser headline, "Fun and Games with Mimi in the White House", for its exposé, "JFK had a Monica".  Mimi Fahnestock confirmed the affair in a statement, but made no further comment at that time.

Once Upon a Secret
After the intrusive press attention of 2003, Alford felt she should try to take control of the story of her own life, and she began to write with her husband's encouragement. An executive editor at Random House looked at about 20 pages and acquired the rights for "close to seven figures" in 2009. Originally subtitled My Hidden Affair with John F. Kennedy, Alford's book was published in April 2011 by Hutchinson Radius, an imprint of Penguin Random House Group, and marketed as "a woman's coming-of-age story". According to the New York Times, "Ms. Alford claims to be completely purged of guilt, grief and baggage by the cleansing process of acknowledging past mistakes. And she describes a happy new marriage."

Once Upon a Secret spent several weeks on the New York Times Best Seller list, the NPR Hardcover Nonfiction Best Seller list, and the Los Angeles Times Best Seller list. 

In an interview with Ann Curry on February 9, 2012, Alford stated that at the time she did not feel guilty about the fact that the President was married, although in hindsight, "I feel guilty about not having felt guilty about Mrs. Kennedy." 

In a subsequent interview with People magazine she stated, "if I was 19...I would do it again—it's hard to say I wouldn't."

Notes

References

1943 births
Living people
American memoirists
American women memoirists
Kennedy administration personnel
Miss Porter's School alumni
People from Red Bank, New Jersey
People from New York City
People from Texarkana, Arkansas
Wheaton College (Massachusetts) alumni
Writers from Arkansas
Mistresses of John F. Kennedy